The Beaker Girls is a British children's television series that premiered on CBBC and BBC iPlayer on 13 December 2021. The series follows on from the events of its predecessors, The Story of Tracy Beaker, Tracy Beaker Returns, The Dumping Ground and My Mum Tracy Beaker. It sees Dani Harmer reprise her role as Tracy Beaker and Emma Maggie Davies return as her daughter Jess. Lisa Coleman and Montanna Thompson also returned, as well as several cast members from My Mum Tracy Beaker. In August 2022, Dani Harmer posted on her Instagram that filming for the second series had finished. The BBC confirmed that Series 2 would be the final series of  the My Mum Tracy Beaker/Beaker Girls trilogy, at least for now. It began airing on 13 January 2023.

Plot
Tracy and Jess are settling into their new life in the seaside town of Cooksea. Their new friend Flo is a former actress who owns a junk shop ironically named 'The Dumping Ground' of which Tracy becomes the manager, they later meet a teenager named Jordan, who is later found out to be a runaway from the care system, and Tracy invites her to stay with her and Jess.

Production
Following the success of the miniseries My Mum Tracy Beaker, in August 2021, CBBC announced that a new series based on the book We Are The Beaker Girls would premiere in mid December. The series saw most of the main cast from My Mum Tracy Beaker reprise their roles along with newcomers Chi-Megan Ennis-McLean as Jordan Whitely and Alibe Parsons as junk shop owner Flo. Wim Snape replaces Jim English in the role as Peter Ingham. The series is set in the fictional town of Cooksea and was filmed in summer 2021 in Clevedon on the North Somerset coast.

Cast

Main
 Dani Harmer as Tracy Beaker
 Emma Maggie Davies as Jessica "Jess" Beaker, Tracy's 12-year-old daughter
 Chi-Megan Ennis-McLean as 15-year-old Jordan, a care runaway teenager
 Lisa Coleman as Camilla "Cam" Lawson, Tracy's adoptive mum and Jess' adoptive grandmother
 Wim Snape as Peter Ingham, an old friend from Tracy's time in care, and the headteacher of Cooksea High
 Danielle Henry as Mary Oliver, Cam's partner and Tracy's stepmother
 Alibe Parsons as Flo, the elderly owner of the junk shop

Recurring
 Montanna Thompson as Justine Littlewood - Tracy's childhood enemy
 Noah Leacock as Tyrone, Jess' best friend
 Jordan Duvigneau as Sean Godfrey, Tracy's ex-boyfriend and father of Justine's baby, Steve Godrey-Littlewood (Series 1)
 Simon Lipkin as Si Martin, Jess' father
 Emma Handy as Mrs Cook, Jess' form teacher
 Daisey Hamilton as Patience "Paysh", Jess' school friend

Guest
Nisha Nayar as Elaine "the Pain" Boyak - Tracy's former social worker

Transmissions

Episodes

Series 1 (2021)
Series one of the beaker girls aired in 2021, and all episodes are on BBC Iplayer, on the 19th of march 2023, it re-aired

Series 2 (2023)

Reception
The series was praised in The Guardian for having a nostalgic feel and was named as one of the seven best shows to watch in December. The writers stated "The Story of The Beaker Girls is just beginning... For millennials who grew up learning about life through Jacqueline Wilson books, the promising exit line of this year’s Tracy Beaker reboot was a welcome one. Following a now grownup Tracy and her daughter Jess, it scratched a nostalgic itch while continuing to beautifully explore the care system, with plenty of silly moments in between."

References

External links
 

Tracy Beaker series
2021 British television series debuts
2020s British children's television series
2020s British LGBT-related drama television series
English-language television shows
BBC children's television shows
The Story of Tracy Beaker